The 1948 season was the Chicago Bears' 29th in the National Football League. The team improved on their 8–4  record from 1947 and finished with a 10–2 record under head coach George Halas, but the team finished second in the NFL Western Division yet again missing out on an NFL title game appearance.

Schedule

Standings

References

Chicago Bears
1948
Chicago Bears